The 19th Legislative Assembly of Ontario was in session from June 19, 1934, until August 25, 1937, just prior to the 1937 general election. The Ontario Liberal Party led by Mitchell Hepburn came to power with a majority government.

Norman Otto Hipel served as speaker for the assembly.

Members elected to the Assembly

Timeline

External links 
Members in Parliament 19

References 

Terms of the Legislative Assembly of Ontario
1934 establishments in Ontario
1937 disestablishments in Ontario